HMS Obdurate was an  which served with the Royal Navy during the First World War. The M class were an improvement on the previous , capable of higher speed. Launched on 21 January 1916 by Scotts of Greenock, the vessel served as part of the Grand Fleet in the Battle of Jutland in May 1916. The destroyer formed part of the cover for the British battlecruisers and was involved in attacks on German battleships and destroyers, but recorded no hits. After the armistice,  Obdurate was assigned to the Local Defence Force at Nore and sold to be broken up on 9 May 1921.

Design and development
Obdurate was one of twenty-two s ordered by the British Admiralty in November 1914 as part of the Third War Construction Programme. The M-class was an improved version of the earlier  destroyers, required to reach a higher speed in order to counter rumoured German fast destroyers. It transpired that the German ships did not exist but the greater performance was appreciated by the navy.

Displacement was  normal and  full load. Three funnels were fitted. The ship had a complement of 76 officers and ratings.

Armament consisted of three  Mk IV QF guns on the ship's centreline, with one on the forecastle, one aft on a raised platform and one between the middle and aft funnels. A single 2-pounder (40 mm) pom-pom anti-aircraft gun was carried, while torpedo armament consisted of two rotating twin mounts for  torpedoes.

Construction and career
Obdurate was laid down by Scotts Shipbuilding and Engineering Company of Greenock with the yard number 465 in May 1915, launched on 21 January the following year and completed on 23 March. The ship was the first of the name to serve with the navy. The vessel was deployed as part of the Grand Fleet, joining the Thirteenth Destroyer Flotilla.

On 30 May 1916, the destroyer sailed with the Grand Fleet to confront the German High Seas Fleet in what would be the Battle of Jutland. Obdurate was one of fourteen M-class destroyers that were allocated to form part of the screen to protect the battlecruisers of the Fleet. Led by the light cruiser , Obdurate and sister ship  took part in the attack of the German fleet that led to the destruction of the battleship . As the warships broke apart, Champion sped away in pursuit of the German fleet, leaving the majority of the destroyers behind, with only Moresby and Obdurate able to keep up.

The small flotilla sought for the main German fleet, and at 2:15 turned westwards towards gunfire. They saw four German cruisers with their attendant destroyers but did not engage as the enemy ships sped away, later narrowly missing attacking four destroyers before they disappeared into the haze. In the aftermath of the battle, Obdurate rescued two sailors from the destroyer , which had been sunk in the action.

On 4 May 1917, Obdurate was escorting the light cruisers  and  when the flotilla came under attack from submarines and airships. The destroyer attacked what was thought to be a submarine periscope and received minor damage when a bomb dropped by Zeppelin L 43 narrowly missed but was otherwise unharmed. The vessel was also involved in escorting merchant ships in the convoys that crossed the Atlantic Ocean.

After the armistice, the Royal Navy returned to a peacetime level of service, and surplus vessels were culled. Obdurate was initially allocated to the Local Defence Force at Nore. On 15 November 1921, the vessel was sold to Cashmore of Newport, Wales, and was broken up from the following May. It was announced that the ship's bell was to be sold on 31 March 1928.

Pennant numbers

References

Citations

Bibliography

 
 
  
 
 
 
 
 
 
 
 
 
 
 
 

1916 ships
Admiralty M-class destroyers
Ships built on the River Clyde
World War I destroyers of the United Kingdom